The Duchy of Tskhumi was a duchy (saeristavo) in a medieval Georgia. Ruled by a House of Shervashidze, the duchy existed from 8th to 14th century, in the north-western part of Georgia and comprised territories around modern Sukhumi, Georgia.

History 

Duchy of Tskhumi was probably formed as a separated feudal entity during the reign of Leon II on the lands of ancient Apsiles. Forming one of the eight duchies of Kingdom of Abkhazia, it comprised territories above Lazica up to Anacopia and Alania. Bagrat's castle served as the seat of the Eristavi of Tskhumi.

In 1033, Bagrat IV's half-brother Demetre organized the plot with the aim of dethrone his brother. Although an attempt by some great nobles to exploit Demetre's possible aspirations to the throne in their opposition to Bagrat's rule failed. Now threatened by Bagrat, the dowager Queen Alda defected to the Byzantines and surrendered Anacopia to the emperor Romanos III who honored her son Demetre with the rank of magistros. According to the words of the chronicler of The Georgian Chronicles: King Bagrat defeated united army of his opponents and then besieged Anacopia, then he went back, leaving Eristav of Abkhazia - Otago Chachasdze and his army to take charge of the fortress. Owing to the active support of the Abkhazian Eristav, Bagrat IV managed to return the fortress of Anacopia to Georgia.

In 12th century, king David the Builder appointed the son of shah Shirvan Otagho as a viceroy of Abkhazia, who later became the founder of House of Shervashidze. The city of Tskhumi (Sukhumi) became the summer residence of the Georgian kings. According to Russian scholar V. Sizov, it became an important "cultural and administrative center of the Georgian state. The historian Yuri Voronov also conjectured that castle might have hosted the queen-regnant Tamar of Georgia during her stays in Abkhazia in the early 13th century. During this period the Eristavi (Duke) of Tskhumi was Otagho Shervashidze.

In the 1240s, Mongols divided Georgia into eight military-administrative sectors (Tumens), the territory of contemporary Abkhazia formed part of the duman administered by Tsotne Dadiani of Odishi. Vakhushti notes that Duchy started to decline in 14th century after consolidation of power in western Georgia by dukes of Odishi. During the civil war between the successors of Imeretian King David Narin — Constantine and Michael, Duke of Odishi, Giorgi I Dadiani, subjugated much of the duchy of Tskhumi and expanded his possessions up to Anacopia, while the Shervashidze entrenched in Abkhazia, from that time on Georgian monarchs were recognizing Tskhumi as a feudal domains of House of Dadiani.

In the 12th–13th centuries, Tskhumi became a center of traffic with the European maritime powers. The Republic of Genoa established their short-lived trading factory at Tskhumi (Sebastopolis) early in the 14th century. Tskhumi served as capital of the Odishi-Megrelian rulers, it was in this city that Vamek I ( 1384-1396), the most influential Dadiani, minted his coins. Documents of the 15th century clearly distinguished Tskhumi from Principality of Abkhazia. The Ottoman navy occupied the town in 1451, but for a short time. Later contested between the princes of Abkhazia and Mingrelia, Tskhumi (Suhum-Kale)  temporarily fell to the Ottoman hands in 1578.

Rulers 
Otagho I Shervashidze (?–1138)
Otagho II Shervashidze (1184–1213)
Dardin Shervashidze (?–1243)
Tsotne Dadiani (1245–c. 1260)
Bedan Dadiani (c. 1270s– c. 1290s)
Giorgi I Dadiani (c. 1293–1323)
Mamia I Dadiani (1323–1345)
Giorgi II Dadiani (1345–1384)
Vameq I Dadiani (1384–1396)
Mamia II Dadiani (1396–1403)
Shervashidze (1403–1412?)
Liparit I Dadiani (1414–1470)
Shamadavle Dadiani (1470–1473)
Vameq II Dadiani (1474–1482)
Liparit II Dadiani (1482–1512)
Mamia III Dadiani (1512–1533)
Levan I Dadiani (1533–1546)
Giorgi III Dadiani (1546–1574)
Mamia IV Dadiani (1574–1578)
Haydar Pasha (1578–1581)
Puto Shervashidze (1581–?)

See also 
 Duchy of Aragvi
 Duchy of Racha
 Duchy of Ksani

References 

Duchies of the Kingdom of Georgia
Principality of Abkhazia
House of Shervashidze